Leslie, My Name Is Evil is a 2009 Canadian film written and directed by Reginald Harkema. It was renamed Manson, My Name Is Evil after its initial release.

Plot
Leslie is a troubled 1960s teenager who eventually becomes a follower of Charles Manson and is charged, convicted, and sentenced to death in August 1969 for the murders of Leno and Rosemary LaBianca.  The story revolves around how a young juror, Perry, becomes infatuated with Leslie during her trial.

Cast
Kristen Hager as Leslie Van Houten
Gregory Smith as Perry
Ryan Robbins as Charlie Manson
Kristin Adams as Dorothy
Peter Keleghan as Walter
Kaniehtiio Horn as Patricia Krenwinkel
Anjelica Scannura as Susan Atkins
Travis Milne as Bobby Beausoleil
Sarah Gadon as Laura
Tom Barnett as Bob Ronka

Release
After the film was renamed, Twitch Film criticized the film's marketing as deceptive, as it emphasized Manson instead of Van Houten.

Reception
Rotten Tomatoes, a review aggregator website, reports that 67% of nine surveyed critics gave the film a positive review; the average rating is 5.96/10. Rick Groen of The Globe and Mail rated it 2/4 stars and called it "a cinematic essay that occasionally seems smart and sometimes just smart-alecky." Peter Howell of the Toronto Star rated it 1.5/4 stars and wrote that Harkema's comparison of the Manson murders to the Vietnam War "a dubious, illogical and frankly offensive connection to make". Todd Brown of Twitch Film wrote that "despite some very promising elements, Harkema is just not quite up to the task."

References

External links

2009 films
2009 drama films
Canadian drama films
Canadian independent films
English-language Canadian films
Courtroom films
Cultural depictions of Charles Manson
Films shot in Toronto
Films set in San Francisco
2009 independent films
2000s English-language films
2000s Canadian films